Răchitova is a commune in Hunedoara County, Transylvania, Romania. It is composed of seven villages: Boița (Boica), Ciula Mare (Nagycsula), Ciula Mică (Kiscsula), Gotești (Gotesdtanya), Mesteacăn (Meszkáton), Răchitova and Vălioara (Valiora).

References

Communes in Hunedoara County
Localities in Transylvania
Țara Hațegului